Cootie Williams in Hi-Fi is an album by trumpeter Cootie Williams, recorded in 1958 and released on the RCA Victor label.

Reception

Cub Koda on AllMusic said the album "shows that Williams' broad style was still mightily intact some 30 years after joining the Ellington fold".

Track listing
 "Just in Time" (Jule Styne, Betty Comden, Adolph Green) – 3:29
 "Summit Ridge Drive" (Artie Shaw) – 3:18
 "Nevertheless I'm in Love with You" (Harry Ruby, Bert Kalmar) – 3:41
 "On the Street Where You Live" (Frederick Loewe, Alan Jay Lerner) – 3:28
 "I'll See You in My Dreams" (Isham Jones, Gus Kahn) – 3:20
 "Contrasts" (Jimmy Dorsey) – 2:55
 "Caravan" (Juan Tizol, Duke Ellington, Irving Mills) – 3:40
 "If I Could Be with You (One Hour Tonight)" (James P. Johnson, Henry Creamer) – 2:39
 "Air Mail Special" (Charlie Christian, Benny Goodman, Jimmy Mundy) – 3:13
 "My Old Flame" (Arthur Johnston, Sam Coslow) – 3:40
 "Swingin' Down the Lane" (Jones, Kahn) – 3:24
 "New Concerto for Cootie" (Cootie Williams) – 3:02
Recorded at Webster Hall in NYC on March 5 (tracks 6–8 & 12), March 25 (tracks 1 & 9–11) and April 8 (tracks 2–5), 1958

Personnel
Cootie Williams – trumpet
Billy Byers, Bobby Byrne, Chauncy Welsch (tracks 2–5), Lou McGarity (tracks 1, 6 & 12), Richard Hixon – trombone
Boomie Richman (tracks A1-A5 & 9–11), Al Klink (tracks 1 & 6–12), Elwyn Fraser, Nick Caizza (tracks: 6–8 & 12), Phil Bodner, Romeo Penque, Stanley Webb (tracks 2–5) – saxophones
Barry Galbraith (track 2–5), George Barnes (tracks 6–8 & 12), Tony Mottola (tracks 1 & 9–11) – guitar
Hank Jones (tracks 1 & 9–11), Henry Rowland (track 2–5), Lou Stein (track 6=8 & 12) – piano
Eddie Safranski – double bass
Don Lamond (track 6–8 & 12), Osie Johnson (tracks 1–5 & 9–11) – drums
Bill Stegmeyer – arranger

References

Cootie Williams albums
1958 albums
RCA Victor albums